Le Havre is a city in the department of Seine-Maritime, situated in the Normandy region of France. The city has a population of 242,474 and is the 13th largest city in France.

Urban transport

Bus

Bus services are operated by CTPO, a subsidiary of Veolia Transport.

1 (Sainte-Adresse (La Hève) - Montivilliers (Gare))
2 (Perrey - Gonfreville-L'Orcher (Parc de l'estuaire))
3 (Grand Hameau - Graville)
4 (Jenner - Perrey)
5 (Sainte-Adresse (St André) - Graville)
6 (Grand Hameau - Gares)
7 (Notre Dame - Gonfreville-L'Orcher (Parc de l'estuaire))
8 (Gares - Soquence)
9 (Gares - Montivilliers (Gare))
10 (Montivlliers (Cours Ste Croix) - Gonfreville-L'Orcher (Parc de l'estuaire))
11 (Octeville (Centre) - G. Brassens)
12 (J. Monod Nord - Gainneville)
13 (Octeville - St Martin du Manoir)
14 (Cité Pelletier - Pissotière à Madame)
15 (Rouelles - Emfrayette)
16 (F. Liszt - M. Bellonte)

Tram

Le Havre has 2 tram routes, serving large parts of the city. Le Havre regained trams on 12 December 2012, after the network was closed in 1957. Both tram routes serve Le Havre railway station.

A (La Plage - Hotel de Ville - Gare - Université - Mare Rouge - Mont-Gaillard)
B (La Plage - Hotel de Ville - Gare - Université - Atrium - Caucriauville)

Funicular

Longer distance transport

Car
Numerous roads link to Le Havre with the main access roads being the A13 Motorway) from Paris, linking to the A131 autoroute and A29 Motorway from Amiens.

Rail

Le Havre railway station is the main station, located in the city centre. The station is served by trains to major cities such as Paris, Rouen, Lyon, Marseille and local services to Fecamp and Rolleville.

Train services are operated by SNCF.

Port

The Port of Le Havre is the largest in France, based on number of containers.

LD Lines operate a ferry services from Portsmouth, England, with one sailing per day.
Brittany Ferries operate a ferry service from Portsmouth during the summer months (May - September).

Air
Paris-Charles de Gaulle Airport can be reached by public transport from Le Havre, with a change of train in Paris.

References

External links
 TaM Official site (French)

Le Havre
Transport in Normandy